The Sebastian Store is a California Historical Landmark (#726). It is the oldest store building along the north coast of San Luis Obispo County. It was built in the 1860s at Whaling Point, California, one-half mile to the west of its current location and has been in its present location since 1878. The Sebastian family has operated the store for over half a century.

It was built in 1852 by Captain Joseph Clark (birthname Machado)  to provide goods and services to whalers and the surrounding community.  It was moved from the point to its present location by George Hearst and operated by the Thorndyke family until 1914.  According to a 2016 article on the "Cambria History Exchange"  the store was established in 1852 by Juan Castro (son-in-law of John Wilson) who owned a portion of Rancho Piedra Blanca.

References 

California Historical Landmarks
Buildings and structures in San Luis Obispo County, California
History of San Luis Obispo County, California
1860s architecture